Ulvsjön is a lake in Stockholm County, Södermanland, Sweden.
It is a common spot for locals and tourists alike to jump off the 5 meter cliffs into the water.

Lakes of Stockholm County